The year 1980 involved some significant events. Below is a list of television-related events in the United States.

Events

Programs
20/20 (1978–present)
60 Minutes (1968–present)
ABC's Wide World of Sports (1961–1998)
Alice (1976–1985)
All My Children (1970–2011)
American Bandstand (1952–1989)
Another World (1964–1999)
Archie Bunker's Place (1979–1983)
As the World Turns (1956–2010)
Barney Miller (1975–1982)
Battle of the Planets (1978–1985)
Benson (1979–1986)
Bozo the Clown (1949–present)
Buck Rogers in the 25th Century (1979–1981)
Candid Camera (1948–2014)
Captain Kangaroo (1955–1984)
Charlie's Angels (1976–1981)
CHiPs (1977–1983)
Dallas (1978–1991)
Days of Our Lives (1965–present)
Dean Martin Celebrity Roast (1974–1984)
Derrick (1974–1998)
Diff'rent Strokes (1978–1986)
Disney's Wonderful World (1954–present; 1979–1981 under this title)
Eight Is Enough (1977–1981)
Face the Nation (1954–present)
Family Feud (1976–1985, 1988–1995, 1999–present)
Fantasy Island (1977–1984)
Fat Albert and the Cosby Kids (1972–1984)
General Hospital (1963–present)
Good Morning America (1975–present)
Guiding Light (1952–2009)
Hallmark Hall of Fame (1951–present)
Happy Days (1974–1984)
Hart to Hart (1979–1984)
Hee Haw (1969–1992)
In Search of... (1977–1982)
Knots Landing (1979–1993)
Laverne & Shirley (1976–1983)
Little House on the Prairie (1974–1983)
Lou Grant (1977–1982)
M*A*S*H (1972–1983)
Masterpiece Theatre (1971–present)
Match Game (1962–1969, 1973–1984, 1990–1991, 1998–1999)
Match Game PM (1975–1981)
Meet the Press (1947–present)
Mister Rogers' Neighborhood (1968–2001)
Monday Night Football (1970–present)
Mork & Mindy (1978–1982)
Mutual of Omaha's Wild Kingdom (1963–1988, 2002–present)
Nightline (1979–present)
One Day at a Time (1975–1984)
One Life to Live (1968–2012)
Professional Bowlers Tour (1962–1997)
Quincy, M.E. (1976–1983)
Real People (1979–1984)
Ryan's Hope (1975–1989)
Saturday Night Live (1975–present)
Schoolhouse Rock! (1973–1986)
Search for Tomorrow (1951–1986)
Sesame Street (1969–present)
Soap (1977–1981)
Soul Train (1971–2006)
SportsCenter (1979–present)
Taxi (1978–1983)
The Doctors (1963–1982)
The Dukes of Hazzard (1979–1985)
The Edge of Night (1956–1984)
The Facts of Life (1979–1988)
The Jeffersons (1975–1985)
The Lawrence Welk Show (1955–1982)
The Love Boat (1977–1986)
The Mike Douglas Show (1961–1981)
The Muppet Show (1976–1981) 
The P.T.L. Club (1976–1987)
The Price Is Right (1972–present)
The Today Show (1952–present)
The Tomorrow Show (1973–1982)
The Tonight Show (1962–1992 as The Tonight Show Starring Johnny Carson)
The Waltons (1972–1981)
The Young and the Restless (1973–present)
This Old House (1979–present)
This Week in Baseball (1977–1998, 2000–2011)
Three's Company (1977–1984)
Trapper John, M.D. (1979–1986)
Truth or Consequences (1950–1988)
Vega$ (1978–1981)
Wheel of Fortune (1975–present)
WKRP in Cincinnati (1978–1982)

Debuting this year

Ending this year

Made-for-TV movies and miniseries

Television stations

Station launches

Network affiliation changes

Births

Deaths

See also
 1980 in the United States
 List of American films of 1980

References

External links
List of 1980 American television series at IMDb